Drummond Nicol Brown (January 31, 1885 – January 27, 1927) was a Major League Baseball catcher.

Brown started his professional career in 1906, at the age of 21, in the Kansas State League. He spent 1909–12 in the Pacific Coast League.

After a few games with the Boston Braves in 1913, Brown jumped to the Kansas City Packers of the Federal League. He played there from 1914 to 1915.

After the Federal League folded, Brown became a police officer in Kansas City, Missouri. He committed suicide by shooting himself in 1927.

References

External links

1885 births
1927 suicides
Major League Baseball catchers
Baseball players from California
Boston Braves players
Kansas City Packers players
Vernon Tigers players
Suicides by firearm in Missouri
1927 deaths
American municipal police officers